Gabrielle Pilote Fortin (born 26 April 1993) is a Canadian professional racing cyclist, who currently rides for UCI Women's Continental Team .

See also
 List of 2016 UCI Women's Teams and riders

References

External links
 

1993 births
Living people
Canadian female cyclists
People from Capitale-Nationale